KEAU (104.7 FM) is a radio station licensed to serve the community of Elko, Nevada. The station is owned by Elko Broadcasting Company. It airs a sports format, with programming from Fox Sports Radio.

The station was assigned the KEAU call letters by the Federal Communications Commission on September 12, 2014.

References

External links
Official Website

EAU (FM)
Radio stations established in 2016
2016 establishments in Nevada
Sports radio stations in the United States
Fox Sports Radio stations
Elko County, Nevada